Chromosome 11 open reading frame 86, also known as C11orf86, is a protein-coding gene in humans. It encodes for a protein known as uncharacterized protein C11orf86, which is predicted to be a nuclear protein. The function of this protein is currently unknown.

Gene

Location 
C11orf86 is located on the long arm of chromosome 11 at 11q13.2. It consists of 1732 base pairs, and is found on the plus strand. Gene neighbors of C11orf86 include uncharacterized LOC105369355, microRNA 6860, microRNA 3163, synaptotagmin 12, ras homolog family member D, and pyruvate carboxylase.

Promoter 
The program ElDorado, by Genomatix, identified the promoter region of C11orf86 on the positive strand from 66974707 to 66975464, for a total length of 758 base pairs.

Expression 
C11orf86 appears to be primarily expressed in the gastrointestinal tract. Expression occurs in ascites, the intestine, the stomach, gastrointestinal tumors, and non-neoplasia.

mRNA

Alternative Splicing 
According to AceView, transcription of the gene produces three different mRNAs, two of which are alternatively spliced variants, while the third is an unspliced form. All three variants could possibly code for functional proteins. The transcript used for this article is made up of two exons, amounting to 1185 base pairs, and has the reference number NM_001136485.1.

Protein

General Properties 
C11orf86 protein is 115 amino acids in length. The molecular weight of C11orf86 is 13.2 kdal. Its isoelectric point is predicted to be 11.9.1   MGTGLRSQSL REPRPSYGKL QEPWGRPQEG QLRRALSLRQ GQEKSRSQGL ERGTEGPDAT 
61  AQERVPGSLG DTEQLIQAQR RGSRWWLRRY QQVRRRWESF VAIFPSVTLS QPASP

Composition 
The majority of the C11orf86 protein is composed of arginine (15.7%), glutamine (12.2%), serine (10.4%), glycine (10.4%), and leucine (9.6%). No cysteine, histidine, or asparagine residues are found in this protein.A  :  6( 5.2%); C  :  0( 0.0%); D  :  2( 1.7%); E  :  9( 7.8%); F  :  2( 1.7%)
G  : 12(10.4%); H  :  0( 0.0%); I  :  2( 1.7%); K  :  2( 1.7%); L  : 11( 9.6%)
M  :  1( 0.9%); N  :  0( 0.0%); P  :  9( 7.8%); Q  : 14(12.2%); R  : 18(15.7%)
S  : 12(10.4%); T  :  5( 4.3%); V  :  4( 3.5%); W  :  4( 3.5%); Y  :  2( 1.7%)C11orf86 has no positive, negative, or mixed charge clusters. However, there is a higher presence of arginine, which is positively charged.1   00000+0000 +-0+0000+0 0-000+00-0 00++0000+0 00-+0+0000 -+00-00-00 
61  00-+000000 -0-000000+ +00+000++0 000+++0-00 0000000000 00000

Domain 
This protein is a part of the DUF4633 superfamily. Proteins that belong to this family are often between 94 and 123 amino acids in length. This domain is found in bacteria, viruses, fungi, plants, insects, reptiles, birds, and mammals.

Post-Translational Modification 
C11orf86 is predicted to have nine possible phosphorylation sites, of which eight are serine, and one is threonine. It is also predicted to have ten O-linked glycosylation sites.

Secondary Structure 
C11orf86 is primarily composed of random coil and alpha helices.

Sub-cellular Localization 
This protein is predicted to be a nuclear protein. There appears to be a bipartite nuclear localization sequence beginning at position 80.

Homology 
The C11orf86 protein is conserved in mammals, and orthologs can easily be traced back to marsupials, monotremes, and reptiles. No orthologs of C11orf86 appear to be present in plants, fungi, fish, amphibians, or birds. There are no paralogs of C11orf86. The table below shows some orthologs that were found using BLAST. Dates of divergence were found from TimeTree, using the median molecular time estimate.

Clinical Significance 
A bipolar disorder association study identified C11orf86 as one of many genes found in a region of linkage disequilibrium on chromosome 11. Despite evidence of some association, C11orf86 was not found to be in an area of particular significance. C11orf86 is down-regulated from non-neoplastic mucosa to adenomas and carcinomas, down-regulated in renal cell carcinoma, and harbors chromosomal gains that are significantly associated with pure mucinous subtypes in mucinous carcinoma.

References 

Genes on human chromosome 11
Uncharacterized proteins